The 1948–49 St. Francis Terriers men's basketball team represented St. Francis College during the 1948–49 NCAA men's basketball season. The team was coached by Daniel Lynch, who was in his first year at the helm of the St. Francis Terriers. The team was a member of the Metropolitan New York Conference and hosted their home games at the 14th Regiment Armory.

The 1948–49 Terriers became the first team in the New York City area to have a game televised, they defeated Seton Hall in its inaugural telecast on WPIX. St. Francis finished the season at 20–13 overall and 2–2 in conference play. They also participated in their second National Catholic Invitation Tournament, where they lost in the finals to Regis 47–51.

Tom Gallagher scored 496 points during the season, which was reported to be new record for a player from the New York Metropolitan Area. In addition, Tom Gallagher, Tom O'Connor, and Paul Labanowski were named to the National Catholic Invitation Tournament All-Tournament Team.

Roster

Schedule and results

|-
!colspan=12 style="background:#0038A8; border: 2px solid #CE1126;;color:#FFFFFF;"| Regular Season

|-
!colspan=12 style="background:#0038A8; border: 2px solid #CE1126;;color:#FFFFFF;"| Benefit Games  

  
|-
!colspan=12 style="background:#0038A8; border: 2px solid #CE1126;;color:#FFFFFF;"| National Catholic Invitation Tournament

                                     
|-

National Catholic Invitation Tournament

In 1949, the Terriers were invited to participate in the first annual National Catholic Invitation Tournament, to take place in Denver, Colorado. Gallagher was awarded a trophy as the Tournaments outstanding player.

NBA Draft

At the end of the season Tom Gallagher was selected with the 45th overall pick by the Baltimore Bullets.

References

St. Francis Brooklyn Terriers men's basketball seasons
St. Francis
Saint Francis
Saint Francis